Suzanne Bergansky is a former member of the Ohio House of Representatives.

External links
Profile on the Ohio Ladies' Gallery website

References

Democratic Party members of the Ohio House of Representatives
Women state legislators in Ohio
Living people
1944 births
20th-century American politicians
20th-century American women politicians
21st-century American women